The XB-59, Boeing model number 701, was a 1950s proposal for a United States supersonic bomber aircraft.

Design and development
In 1949 the US government canceled the Boeing XB-55 contract, which had been an effort to produce a subsonic replacement for the just-being-introduced Boeing B-47 Stratojet. The XB-55 project had started in 1947, but by the end of the decade it was apparent that if strategic penetration in warfare were to be successful at all, it would require aircraft much faster than the jet fighter aircraft which were then being placed into operation.  Thus the funding made available by the XB-55 cancellation was earmarked for the study of a supersonic medium bomber, and a request for proposals was extended to several aircraft companies.

Boeing submitted a proposal for a four-engine, high-wing aircraft with a highly streamlined fuselage.  The four engines would be buried in thickened wing roots; the remaining wing planform was highly tapered.

Developed under weapons system designation MX-1965, the XB-59 was to have a crew of three, and would be powered by four GE J73-X24A turbojet engines, mounted in the roots of the 73 foot span wings. The landing gear would be similar to the bicycle arrangement found on the B-47 and B-52 Stratofortress, with wingtip-mounted outriggers.

The Boeing contract for the XB-59 was canceled in late 1952 after the Convair company's submission, designated B-58 Hustler, was selected for development.

The Boeing effort was a design study only, and no construction was involved.

Specifications

See also

External links

 XB-59, from USAF Museum
 Russian page about XB-59, includes drawings at bottom of page

B-59
Quadjets
Cancelled military aircraft projects of the United States
High-wing aircraft
Bomber aircraft